Carrick v. Snyder was a 2015 federal court case requesting that the plaintiff Rev. Neil Patrick Carrick be allowed to perform marriage ceremonies that are currently prohibited, including same sex and polygamy wedding ceremonies.

The case lists the Michigan Governor Governor Rick Snyder and Attorney General Bill Schuette as defendants.

The Detroit minister Pastor Neil Patrick Carrick sued to invalidate Mich. Stat. § 551.14, which provides,

The case was filed on January 12, 2015, in the Eastern District of Michigan, Southern Division. It was assigned to District Judge Judith Ellen Levy under the case number 5:2015cv10108.

The case was dismissed with prejudice on February 10, 2016, for lack of standing.

References

External links
 https://web.archive.org/web/20150402092609/http://www.carrickvsnyder.info/

United States District Court for the Eastern District of Michigan cases
Legal history of Michigan
LGBT rights in Michigan
2015 in Michigan
2015 in United States case law
United States same-sex union case law
United States equal protection case law
United States privacy case law
United States substantive due process case law
Polygamy law in the United States
Same-sex marriage law in the United States
2015 in LGBT history